83rd Street (Avalon Park) is an electrified commuter rail station along the Metra Electric Main Line in Chicago, Illinois. Despite the name of the station, it is actually located in Chatham, not the Avalon Park neighborhood for which it is named; however, it is only a short distance from Avalon Park. The station's rank is tied with the neighboring 87th Street (Woodruff) station.

Like much of the main branch of the Metra Electric line, 83rd Street-Avalon Park is built on elevated tracks near the embankment of a bridge over 83rd Street. This bridge also carries an Amtrak line (owned by Canadian National Railway) that runs parallel to it, carrying the City of New Orleans, Illini, and Saluki trains. The former Nickel Plate Railroad ran just east of the Metra tracks. It also had a station stop at 83rd Street. The Nickel Plate right-of-way now is overgrown with trees. 

There is another 83rd Street station on the South Chicago Branch.

Side-street parking is available on 83rd Street between the tracks and Woodlawn Avenue. Currently, no bus connections are available.

References

External links 

83rd Street entrance from Google Maps Street View

Metra stations in Chicago
Former Illinois Central Railroad stations
Railway stations in the United States opened in 1926